Kosmos 146 ( meaning Cosmos 146), also known as L-1 No. 2P, was a Soviet test spacecraft precursor to the Zond series, launched from the Baikonur Cosmodrome aboard a Proton K rocket.

The spacecraft was designed to launch a crew from the Earth to conduct a flyby of the Moon and return to Earth. The primary focus was a Soviet circumlunar flight, which help document the Moon, and also show Soviet power. The test ran from the Zond program from 1967-1970, which produced multiple failures in the 7K-L1's re-entry systems. The remaining 7K-L1s were scrapped, ultimately replaced by the Soyuz 7K-L3.

Objectives
Kosmos 146 was a Soviet test precursor to the Zond series, launched from the Baikonur cosmodrome aboard a Proton K rocket. It was launched into a planned highly elliptical Earth orbit. The Blok D stage functioned correctly in putting the spacecraft into a translunar trajectory. It was not aimed at the Moon and no recovery of the spacecraft was planned or attempted. It was a successful mission that created false confidence just before a string of failures that would follow.

Kosmos 146 was launched using a Proton-K carrier rocket, which flew from Site 81/23 at Baikonur. The launch occurred at 11:30:33 GMT on 10 March 1967 and was successful. Kosmos 146 decayed from orbit on 18 March 1967.

Moon race
By the time the spacecraft was launched, the United States had already thrust into the orbit in their prototype of the lunar vehicle (AS-201, AS-202, AS-203). The United States could go on to launch manned prototypes of lunar ships before the USSR brought the first unmanned prototype into orbit, but two months before the launch of Kosmos-146, during the fire in the command module, the crew of Apollo 1 was killed.

References

External links
 http://militera.lib.ru/db/kamanin_np/index.html
 http://www.svengrahn.pp.se/histind/Cosmos146/Cosmos146.htm#data
 https://www.hq.nasa.gov/pao/History/SP-4225/documentation/mhh/mirheritage.pdf

Kosmos satellites
Soviet space probes
Zond program
Spacecraft launched in 1967
1967 in the Soviet Union